Succa may refer to:

 Sukkah, the booths erected for Sukkot, the annual Jewish commemoration of the Exodus from Egypt
 Succa people, an early indigenous people of the Carolinas
 Succa, an eye dialect spelling of sucker